Lee Ea-sop (born 25 March 2000) is a South Korean swimmer. She competed in the women's 200 metre freestyle event at the 2017 World Aquatics Championships.

References

External links
 

2000 births
Living people
Place of birth missing (living people)
South Korean female freestyle swimmers
21st-century South Korean women